Marten Waefelaerts (1748 - 1799) was a Flemish 18th century landscape painter.

He was probably born in Antwerp, but little is known about his early years.

He worked in the years 1790–1800. In 1792, he exhibited three landscapes in Ghent. In 1793, the "Konstmaetschappije" showed four seascapes in the Schermer Hall in Antwerp: "Ships at a stream at sunset", "Ships in a turbulent rive", "A Dutch yacht on the Scheldt to Antwerp" and "The Scheldt view on a quay in Antwerp".

He also painted religious themes, and made engravings. Other spellings of his surname are Waeffelaer and Waffelaerts.

References

External links 
 Skaters on frozen river

Belgian landscape painters
1748 births
1799 deaths